Benjamin Narteh Ayiku (born 5 August 1964) is a Ghanaian politician. He is a member of the Eighth Parliament of the Fourth Republic of Ghana representing the Ledzokuku Constituency in the Ledzokuku Municipal District in the Greater Accra Region of Ghana.

Early life and career 
Ayiku was born on 5 August 1964. He hails from Teshie. He holds a General Certificate Of Education (1986).

Politics 
Ayiku is a member of the  National Democratic Congress(NDC). He was the party's candidate for the December 2020 election. He won the  parliamentary election with 55,938 votes representing 50.5% of the total votes cast, beating his main opponent and incumbent member of parliament Bernard Okoe Boye of the New patriotic Party who obtained 54,072 votes representing 48.8% of the total valid votes cast.

Committees 
He serves as a member of Food, Agriculture and Cocoa Affairs Committee and Members holding Office of Profit  Committee respectively in the Eighth Parliament of the Fourth Republic of Ghana.

Personal life 
He is a Christian.

References 

Living people
1964 births
Ghanaian MPs 2021–2025